Yamacraw is an unincorporated community and  coal town in McCreary County, Kentucky, United States. It was also known as Big South Fork. Their post office closed in 1950. The Lonesome post office was associated with the Yamacraw area.

References

Unincorporated communities in McCreary County, Kentucky
Unincorporated communities in Kentucky
Coal towns in Kentucky